WMRE (1550 AM) is a sports formatted broadcast radio station licensed to Charles Town, West Virginia, serving Charles Town and Jefferson County, West Virginia.  WMRE is owned and operated by iHeartMedia.

While the station is licensed to Charles Town, West Virginia, where the station's tower is also located, the station is run from the iHeartMedia studios in Winchester, Virginia.

References

External links
Fox Sports 1550 Online

MRE
IHeartMedia radio stations
Sports radio stations in the United States